Kamin Rural District is a rural district (dehestan) in the Central District of Pasargad County, Fars Province, Iran. At the 2006 census, its population was 5,522, in 1,268 families.  The rural district has 22 villages.

References 

Rural Districts of Fars Province
Pasargad County